Kansas's 21st Senate district is one of 40 districts in the Kansas Senate. It has been represented by Democrat Dinah Sykes since 2017; Sykes was first elected as a Republican but switched parties in 2018.

Geography
District 21 is based in Lenexa in the Johnson County suburbs of Kansas City, covering the vast majority of that city as well as smaller parts of Overland Park and Shawnee.

The district is located entirely within Kansas's 3rd congressional district, and overlaps with the 14th, 16th, 17th, 22nd, 23rd, 24th, 30th, and 121st districts of the Kansas House of Representatives.

Recent election results

2020

2016

2012

Federal and statewide results in District 21

References

21
Johnson County, Kansas